Damien Harris (born February 11, 1997) is an American football running back who is a free agent. He played college football at Alabama and was selected by the Patriots in the third round of the 2019 NFL Draft.

Early years
Harris attended Madison Southern High School in Berea, Kentucky. During his high school football career, he rushed for 6,748 yards with 122 touchdowns. He was rated by the Rivals.com recruiting network as a five-star recruit. Harris was ranked as the top running back and the eighth best overall player in his class. Harris committed to the University of Alabama to play college football under head coach Nick Saban.

College career
Harris was a backup to Derrick Henry as a true freshman at Alabama in 2015. He played in 12 games and rushed for 157 yards on 46 carries. With Henry leaving for the NFL, Harris became Alabama's starting running back in 2016, beating out Bo Scarbrough. In his first career start against USC in the season opener, he rushed for 138 yards on nine carries. In the third game, against Ole Miss, Harris carried 16 times for 144 yards, including a 67-yard run in which he out-muscled two defenders. A sprained knee against Kent State on September 24 caused him to sit out the rest of the game, but he returned the following week against Kentucky. Against Arkansas on October 8, Harris had 122 yards rushing, 60 yards receiving, and a touchdown reception. Harris had his fourth 100-yard game of the season against Texas A&M, rushing for 125 yards on 18 carries. He graduated in December 2018.

Statistics

Professional career

2019 season
Harris was selected by the New England Patriots in the third round with the 87th overall pick of the 2019 NFL Draft. He made his professional debut in the team's Week 7 33–0 victory over the New York Jets, rushing for 12 yards on four carries.  It would be his only carries for the season as he was a healthy scratch for most of his rookie season.

2020 season

On September 7, 2020, Harris was placed on injured reserve with a broken finger. He was activated on October 5, 2020. In Week 4 against the Kansas City Chiefs, he had 17 carries for 100 rushing yards in the 26–10 loss. In Week 8, against the Buffalo Bills, he had 16 carries for 102 rushing yards and his first career rushing touchdown in the 24–21 loss. In Week 10, Harris rushed the ball 22 times for 121 yards, both career highs, helping lead the Patriots to a 23–17 upset victory over the Baltimore Ravens on Sunday Night Football. He was placed back on injured reserve on January 2, 2021. He finished the season as the Patriots leading rusher with 691 yards and two touchdowns through 10 games.

2021 season
Harris was the team's primary starter for the 2021 season. He started the first nine games of the season, though a concussion sustained in Week 9 kept him out the Week 10 game against the Cleveland Browns. He returned as the starter for Week 11.  He had 100+ yard performances in Week 1 against the Miami Dolphins, Week 6 against the Dallas Cowboys, and Week 7 against the New York Jets. He was mostly ineffectual, however, during the Week 3 and 4 losses against the New Orleans Saints and the Tampa Bay Buccaneers respectively, being held to only 10 total yards rushing combined between the two games. Starting in Week 8, he began to split carries with backup Rhamondre Stevenson. He finished the season with a career-high 929 rushing yards and second in the league with 15 rushing touchdowns.

2022 season
Harris entered the 2022 season as the Patriots starting running back, with Rhamondre Stevenson close behind him. A hamstring injury suffered in Week 5 slowed down his production and allowed Stevenson to overtake him as the lead back, but still split carries with the second-year player. He suffered a thigh injury in Week 12 and missed the next four games. He finished the season with 462 rushing yards and three touchdowns.

NFL career statistics

References

External links

New England Patriots
Alabama Crimson Tide bio
College stats from Sports Reference

1997 births
Living people
People from Richmond, Kentucky
Players of American football from Kentucky
American football running backs
Alabama Crimson Tide football players
New England Patriots players